Nai is a village near Udaipur in the state of Rajasthan, India. The village is surrounded by the Aravalli Range mountains. There is a lake nearby called "Nandeshwar Lake", named after the ancient Shiva temple of Nandeshwar.

List of lakes in India
List of lakes in India

References

Villages in Udaipur district